Hurricane Fiona was a large, powerful, and destructive Category 4 Atlantic hurricane which was the costliest and most intense tropical or post-tropical cyclone to hit Canada on record. It was the sixth named storm, third hurricane and first major hurricane of the 2022 Atlantic hurricane season. Fiona developed from a tropical wave that emerged from West Africa, before developing into a tropical depression east of the Leeward Islands on September 14, 2022. On September 15, 2022, it was assigned the name Fiona, even though dry air and moderate to strong wind shear were still impacting the system.

On September 16, 2022, Fiona passed over Guadeloupe as it entered the Caribbean Sea, where atmospheric conditions improved, and strengthened into a hurricane as it approached Puerto Rico two days later. A few hours afterward, the eye of Fiona made landfall along the southwestern coast of Puerto Rico, near Punta Tocon, between the municipalities of Lajas and Cabo Rojo at 19:20 UTC, according to the National Hurricane Center. The hurricane made landfall in the Dominican Republic shortly thereafter, and then strengthened into the first major hurricane of the season. As the storm slowly moved through the Turks and Caicos, it continued to strengthen and reached Category 4 status the following day, while accelerating north. After fluctuating between category 3 and 4 intensity as it passed Bermuda, Fiona quickly transitioned into a large and powerful extratropical cyclone and struck Nova Scotia with  winds and minimum pressure of 931 mbar early on September 24. Fiona then quickly weakened as it moved through the Gulf of St. Lawrence and moved back over the northwestern Atlantic. The remnants then dissipated over Baffin Bay to the west of Greenland on September 28.

As the first island hit by the storm, Guadeloupe received near-record rainfall, leaving 40% of the population without water for a few days. Puerto Rico suffered from the worst flooding since Hurricane Maria of 2017, and an island-wide blackout occurred. A third of the territory's population was left without water, and at least 25 people died. In the Dominican Republic and the Turks and Caicos, the islands were pounded by heavy rainfall and strong winds, causing flooding and blackouts. Fiona was the strongest hurricane recorded in Canada based on atmospheric pressure and was one of the wettest ever recorded in the country as well.

Meteorological history

Early on September 12, 2022, the NHC began to monitor a tropical wave over the central tropical Atlantic for gradual development, though environmental conditions for development were assessed as only marginally favorable. Even so, shower and thunderstorm activity within the disturbance began to become more concentrated later that same day, then increased and became better organized during the next day. The circulation associated with the system became more defined and persisted overnight and into the morning of September 14, attaining sufficient organization to designated as Tropical Depression Seven later that day. Despite the continued effects of moderate westerly shear and dry mid-level air flow, new satellite imagery indicated the depression had strengthened, thus at 01:45 UTC on September 15, it became Tropical Storm Fiona.

The storm passed over Guadeloupe with  winds on September 16, as it entered the eastern Caribbean. Early on September 18, the storm strengthened into a hurricane as it approached Puerto Rico. Fiona weakened slightly over land, but after emerging off the northern coast of the Dominican Republic and back over the Atlantic Ocean, it began to intensify again, reaching Category 2 intensity at 21:00 UTC on September 19.

Fiona then reached Category 3 intensity at 06:00 UTC the next morning, becoming the first major hurricane of the season. Gradual strengthening continued and Fiona became a Category 4 hurricane at 06:00 UTC September 21. Extremely large waves reached the Atlantic coast of Nova Scotia late September 24.
	
Fiona then moved over Cape Breton Island with hurricane strength winds, although it continued to weaken as it moved northward into the Gulf of St. Lawrence. Fiona would continue to weaken as it moved erratically northward into the northwestern Atlantic before dissipating west of Greenland over Baffin Bay on September 28.

Preparations 

After the naming of Fiona, tropical storm watches were issued for the islands of Saba, St. Eustatius, St. Maarten, Antigua and Barbuda, St. Kitts and Nevis, Montserrat, and Anguilla. These were raised to tropical storm warnings two advisories later with watches extended south to Guadeloupe, St. Barthelemy, and St. Martin. As Fiona moved west, tropical storm watches then warnings were put in place for Puerto Rico and the U.S. Virgin Islands. Parts of the Dominican Republic also had tropical storm watches put in place.

On September 17, the first hurricane watches were put in place for Puerto Rico and soon after, the Dominican Republic. By 14:00 UTC the same day, the hurricane watch in Puerto Rico was upgraded to a hurricane warning with the watch extended to the U.S. Virgin Islands. As a result, Virgin Islands National Park closed.

On approach to Atlantic Canada, Fiona's unprecedented strength prompted the Canadian Hurricane Centre to warn residents of "heavy rainfall" and powerful "hurricane force winds". The center also called the event "severe". Bob Robichaud, a meteorologist for Environment and Climate Change Canada, said the storm will be one that "everybody remembers". The Kejimkujik National Park temporarily closed due to the extratropical cyclone.

Impact

At least 31 deaths have been confirmed throughout the Caribbean and Canada from Hurricane Fiona as of September 30. The search and rescue team took about two weeks to finish their search of people that were missing.

Guadeloupe

Guadeloupe received large amounts of rain, at a rate of more than 150 mm per hour in some places where the rivers washed away dozen of roads and bridges, and one person died when his house was washed away in the floods near the Rivière des Pères in the district of Basse-Terre. Firefighters carried out 130 interventions and 23 people were rescued. The storm left over 1.000 homeless and the minister Jean-François Carenco declared area of natural disaster September 24 for 22 towns.

Puerto Rico

On September 18, Hurricane Fiona caused a power outage in the entirety of Puerto Rico. All aspects of the grid were damaged, including substations and high voltage power lines. Preliminary assessments indicated the grid suffered more than US$2 billion in damage. The winds from the storm covered the entire island bringing heavy rainfall. That day, U.S. President Joe Biden declared a state of emergency over the hurricane. A flash flood warning was declared on September 19. Roads were stripped of pavement due to Fiona's torrential rainfall, roofs were torn off houses, and at least one bridge was completely washed away. A million people, about 33% of the population, were left without drinking water. Two days after the storm, less than 10% of customers had their power restored. Many landslides were recorded throughout the island. Many crops were destroyed, and agriculture secretary Ramón González Beiró forecast a roughly $100 million loss this year.

U.S. President Joe Biden declared a state of emergency over the storm on September 18, 2022, and all flights to and from Luis Muñoz Marín International Airport were canceled. On the same day, the effects of Fiona's massive rainfall cut off all of the power in Puerto Rico. At least 21 deaths in Puerto Rico have been attributed to the hurricane.

Dominican Republic
The eye of Hurricane Fiona made landfall along the coast of the Dominican Republic near Boca de Yuma at 07:30 UTC on September 19. It was the first hurricane to make landfall in the country in 18 years.

President Luis Abinader declared state of emergency in five southeastern provinces and three northeastern provinces and visited La Altagracia, El Seibo and Hato Mayor — the most damaged provinces — on 20 September 2022. Over one million people were left without running water and another 350,000 in the country were left without electricity in the country after Fiona had passed. Widespread rainfall totals of  drenched the country. At least 2 people were killed and over 8,300 homes were destroyed in the Dominican Republic. President Abinader stated that damage from the storm exceeded 20 billion Dominican pesos (US$375 million).

Turks and Caicos 
Fiona's eye passed through the Grand Turks island, severely affecting the telecommunications in the archipelago. At least 40% of the territory was left without electricity, with total blackouts reported in North Caicos, Middle Caicos, South Caicos, Grand Turk and Salt Cay. 30% of Providenciales experienced power outages. Moderate damage and no deaths were reported.

Bermuda
Over 80% of the island lost power.

Eastern Canada

Fiona made landfall near Whitehead, Nova Scotia, on the morning of September 24 as a recently transitioned extratropical cyclone with hurricane-force winds. It was likely the strongest storm in Canadian history as gauged by barometric pressure; a pressure of 932.7 mbar (hPa; 27.54 inHg) was unofficially measured on Hart Island, potentially setting the all-time low pressure record for any landfalling cyclone on Canadian shores. The pressure was also potentially lower than any other air pressure measurement along the coast of eastern Northern America outside of the United States Gulf Coast states. Fiona also generated large waves and destructive storm surge, with the highest waves occurring east of the storm's center. The onshore push of storm surge led to record water level heights being set at Escuminac, New Brunswick, and Channel-Port aux Basques. Rainfall totals from Fiona were less than anticipated due to the entrainment of dry air into the cyclone.

Fiona affected the four provinces of Atlantic Canada, as well as Quebec. The storm caused major flooding in Quebec's Magdalen Islands, southeastern New Brunswick, Prince Edward Island, northeastern Nova Scotia, and southern Newfoundland. Thousands of trees were knocked down and uprooted in Nova Scotia from Halifax eastward, as well as most of southeastern New Brunswick, most of P.E.I., and some parts in Newfoundland. At least 20 homes were damaged or destroyed in Newfoundland, primarily in Channel-Port aux Basques, with almost 200 people displaced. Fiona left more than 500,000 customers without power, including 80% of all Nova Scotia customers and 95% of Prince Edward Island customers. A Port aux Basques woman was killed when her home was destroyed and she was swept into the ocean; another person died of carbon monoxide poisoning while operating an electrical generator in Prince Edward Island. Another man in Lower Prospect, Nova Scotia was swept out to sea and presumed dead. Teacup Rock, a rock formation and local tourist attraction on the coast near Thunder Cove, Prince Edward Island, was destroyed after Hurricane Fiona struck. Fiona also caused severe erosion to the province's dune system, particularly within Prince Edward Island National Park. On September 25, Deputy Premier of Quebec Geneviève Guilbault flew to the Magdalen Islands to view the storm damage.

Insured losses from Fiona in Canada are estimated to be at least $800 million CAD (US$600 million), with the total damage expected to be significantly higher. This became the costliest weather event in Atlantic Canada history, and the seventh-costliest nationwide (adjusted for inflation).

Aftermath

Puerto Rico 
At least 670 people were rescued from impacted sites following Fiona's deluge. U.S. President Joe Biden approved a disaster declaration for the island, allowing funding for search and rescue, debris removal, and shelter and food among other accommodations for a month. Damage and debris left from Fiona disallowed rescuers and officials from entering affected areas. By September 22, 470 people and 48 pets remained in shelters. Biden's disaster declaration also allowed FEMA to assist survivors in 55 municipalities and for public assistance in all 78 of them. 7 million liters of water, 4 million ready-to-eat meals, more than 215 generators, 100,000 tarps, and more were provided in four warehouses around Puerto Rico. A few days after the hurricane struck, a delegation from United Hatzalah of Israel arrived to provide psychological and emotional stabilization to those affected by the storm in various sections of the island. Working together with local community leaders and organizations including PR4PR, Chabad, and FREMS, the team assisted hundreds of people in the municipalities of Anasco and Loiza providing them with basic medical check ups, and psychological first aid tools to help them cope with the aftermath of the storm.

Dominican Republic 
A few days after the hurricane, New York City mayor Eric Adams visited the Dominican Republic and Puerto Rico. After the visit, he requested a $3.7 billion supplemental bill for emergency and nutritional aid.

See also

 Weather of 2022
 Tropical cyclones in 2022
 List of Category 4 Atlantic hurricanes
 List of Canada hurricanes
 List of Puerto Rico hurricanes
 List of costliest Atlantic hurricanes
 List of United States flash flood emergencies
Historic comparisons to Fiona
 1893 San Roque hurricane – a Category 3 hurricane that took a similar track to Fiona.
 Hurricane Ginny (1963) – a Category 2 hurricane that was previously the most intense storm to hit Nova Scotia.
 Hurricane Hortense (1996) – a Category 4 hurricane which had a near-identical track and intensity to Fiona.
 Hurricane Juan (2003) – a storm which made landfall in Nova Scotia as a category 2 hurricane, albeit much smaller in size.
 Hurricane Jeanne (2004) – the last hurricane to make a direct landfall in the Dominican Republic prior to Fiona.
 Hurricane Igor (2010) – a Category 4 hurricane which became the most destructive hurricane to strike Newfoundland.
 Hurricane Maria (2017) – a major hurricane which had a similar track to Fiona and made landfall in Puerto Rico as a high-end Category 4 hurricane, caused catastrophic damage and a total island-wide power outage.

References

External links 

 The National Hurricane Center's advisory archive on Hurricane Fiona

Fiona
Fiona
Fiona
Fiona
Fiona
Fiona
Fiona
Fiona
Fiona
Fiona
2022 in Guadeloupe
2022 in Puerto Rico
September 2022 events in Canada
September 2022 events in North America
2022 disasters in Canada
Natural disasters in Guadeloupe
Natural disasters in Puerto Rico
Natural disasters in Nova Scotia
Natural disasters in Prince Edward Island
Natural disasters in New Brunswick
Natural disasters in Newfoundland and Labrador
Natural disasters in Quebec
2022 in Nova Scotia
2022 in Prince Edward Island
2022 in New Brunswick
2022 in Newfoundland and Labrador
2022 in Quebec
2022 floods
2022 floods in the United States